Ruud Cremers (born 3 January 1992 in Gulpen) is a Dutch cyclist riding for Team Novo Nordisk.

References

1992 births
Living people
Dutch male cyclists
People from Gulpen-Wittem
Cyclists from Limburg (Netherlands)
21st-century Dutch people